Herniaria is a genus of flowering plants in the family Caryophyllaceae known generally as ruptureworts. They are native to Eurasia and Africa but several species have been widely introduced to other continents. These are flat, mat-forming annual herbs. The genus gets its scientific and common names from the once-held belief that species could be used as an herbal remedy for hernias.

Selected species
Herniaria algarvica
Herniaria cachemiriana
Herniaria capensis
Herniaria caucasica
Herniaria ciliolata
Herniaria cinerea
Herniaria glabra
Herniaria hirsuta
Herniaria lusitanica
Herniaria lusitanica subsp. berlengiana
Herniaria maritima
Herniaria kotovii 
Herniaria parnassica
Herniaria polygama
Herniaria pujosii
Herniaria setigera
Herniaria suavis

References

External links
Flora of China

 
Caryophyllaceae genera